Sir William Eric Kinloch Anderson  (27 May 1936 – 22 April 2020) was a British teacher and educator, who was head master of Eton College from 1980 to 1994 and provost of Eton College from September 2000 to January 2009.

Life and career

Anderson was born on 27 May 1936 and schooled at George Watson's College, Edinburgh. He graduated from the University of St Andrews with first-class honours in English language and literature and then a Master of Letters (MLitt) degree from Balliol College, University of Oxford.

During his early career, Anderson taught at Fettes College in Edinburgh and at Gordonstoun where he taught Prince Charles. He moved to be headmaster at Abingdon School (1970–75), Shrewsbury School (1975–80) and Eton College (1980–94) and he was rector of Lincoln College, Oxford (1994–2000). He was chairman of the Heritage Lottery Fund (1998–2001) and provost of Eton College (2000–2009).

At Fettes, he was Prime Minister Tony Blair's housemaster. Blair subsequently named Anderson in a 1997 advertising campaign run by the Teacher Training Agency, entitled "No one forgets a good teacher". Head Master of Eton while David Cameron and Boris Johnson were there, Anderson was involved in the education of the heir to the British throne and three British prime ministers, as well as Rory Stewart, Justin Welby, Archbishop of Canterbury, the Olympic oarsman Matthew Pinsent and the actors Dominic West and Damian Lewis. He was a supporter of the direct grant system.

The Clarendon Press published Anderson's edition of The Journal of Sir Walter Scott in 1972 and he became a trustee of Scott's Abbotsford during its refurbishment. He was elected a fellow of the Royal Society of Edinburgh in 1985 and, in 2002, he was appointed a Knight of the Order of the Thistle.

He retired as provost of Eton on 30 January 2009, and was succeeded by William Waldegrave.

His other positions included visitor at Harris Manchester College, Oxford; member of the visiting committee of Harvard University Memorial Church; trustee of the Royal Collection Trust; and chairman of Cumberland Lodge. He received honorary degrees from the University of St Andrews, Hull, Siena, Birmingham, the University of Aberdeen and Buckingham.

Personal life
Anderson was the son of William James Kinloch Anderson, proprietor of the Edinburgh-based kilt-making business Kinloch Anderson, and Margaret Gouinlock Harper. He was married to Elizabeth ("Poppy") Anderson, daughter of William and Mary Mason of Skipton. Their son is David Anderson (Lord Anderson of Ipswich KBE QC) and their daughter Kate is married to Will Gompertz.

He was an honorary Old Abingdonian and in 2018 accompanied Poppy, Kate and Will Gompertz, to open Beech Court at Abingdon School. 
Anderson died on 22 April 2020 at the age of 83, two days after his 60th wedding anniversary.

See also
 List of Old Abingdonians

References

Alumni of the University of St Andrews
Alumni of Balliol College, Oxford
People educated at George Watson's College
Scottish schoolteachers
Fellows of Lincoln College, Oxford
Fellows of the Royal Society of Edinburgh
Knights of the Thistle
Headmasters of Shrewsbury School
Rectors of Lincoln College, Oxford
Head Masters of Eton College
Heads of Abingdon School
1936 births
2020 deaths
Provosts of Eton College